Lelant Downs is a  hamlet in the parish of Ludgvan, Cornwall, England.

References

Hamlets in Cornwall